The western footballer (Neatypus obliquus), also known as the footballer sweep, is a species of sea chub endemic to southern reefs of Australia, where it can be found down to .  It can also be found in the aquarium trade.  This species is currently the only known member of its genus.

The compressed body is silvery-blue, with orange to yellow diagonal striping bordered by a brownish black; fins match the shade of yellowy-orange.

It occurs near inshore and offshore reefs of the southern Australia coast in active and large schools. The range is from Shark Bay, to Flinders Island, South Australia. They feed on benthic zone invertebrates and zooplankton.

Other species of its family are known as footballers, for the similarity to footballer's striped jumpers.

References

External links

Fishes of Australia : Neatypus obliquus

western footballer
Vertebrates of Western Australia
Fauna of South Australia
western footballer